Enes Bešić (born 5 June 1963) is a Bosnian-Herzegovinian former football midfielder.

Club career
He was one of the most influential players in the 1980s in NK Čelik Zenica that earned him a transfer to Belgrade giants Red Star in 1988.  During the winter break of 1990-91 he moved to Portugal to play with Primeira Liga side S.C. Salgueiros.

References

External sources
 
 archives.lesoir.be

1963 births
Living people
Association football midfielders
Yugoslav footballers
Bosnia and Herzegovina footballers
NK Čelik Zenica players
Red Star Belgrade footballers
S.C. Salgueiros players
Yugoslav First League players
Primeira Liga players
Yugoslav expatriate footballers
Expatriate footballers in Portugal

Bosnia and Herzegovina expatriate sportspeople in Portugal